Prisoners' Union is a Russian human rights monitoring non-governmental organization. The organization was founded in 2008. The Prisoners' Union foundation meeting was held in Moscow and was attended by 40 former political prisoners.
Prisoners' Union works to expose human rights violations within the penal system in Russia. Prisoners' Union publishes monitoring materials regarding the situation in Russian prisons and holds press conferences. The organization calls for an amnesty for all political prisoners in Russia.

See also
 Prisons in Russia
 Human rights in Russia
 Prison abolition movement
 Prisoners' rights

References

External links
 Prisoners' Union - official website

Civil rights organizations
Human rights organizations based in Russia
Prison-related organizations
Prisons in Russia